Dança dos Famosos 2011 is the eighth season of the Brazilian reality television show Dança dos Famosos which premiered on May 22, 2011, at 7:30 p.m./6:30 p.m. (BRT/AMT) on Rede Globo.

Actor Miguel Roncato won the competition over Zorra Total Comedian Nelson Freitas by 0.1 of the final total (75.8 x 75.7), making this the second closest finish ever. Roncato also became the youngest winner of the series at age of 18.

Couples

Scoring Chart

Average Chart

Couples who did not get on the scores stage are listed in order of placement.

Styles, Scores and Songs

Week 1 
Presentation of the Celebrities

Week 2 
Judges in order from left to right: Artistic Jury – Emanuelle Araujo (Singer), André Marques (TV Host), Luiz Maluf (Caras Magazine Editor); Technical Jury – Paulo Goulart Filho (Choreographer), Fernanda Chamma (Artistic Director); Skype Judge – Artur Xexeo (Journalist).
Running Order

Week 3
Judges in order from left to right: Artistic Jury – Amanda Braga (Model), Ancelmo Gois (Journalist), Ana Maria Braga (TV Host); Technical Jury – Carlota Portella (Choreographer), Renato Vieira (Artistic Director); Skype Judge – Joyce Pascowitch (Journalist).

Running Order

Week 4
Judges in order from left to right: Artistic Jury – Mayana Neiva (Actress), Malvino Salvador (Actor), Massimo Ferrari (Chef); Technical Jury – Carlinhos de Jesus (Choreographer), Maria Pia Finocchio (Artistic Director); Skype Judge – José Simão (Journalist).

Running Order

Week 5
Judges in order from left to right: Artistic Jury – Diogo Nogueira (Singer), Ana Furtado (TV Host and Actress), Sonia Racy (Journalist); Technical Jury – Jayme Arôxa (Choreographer), Carla Salvagni (Dance Teacher); Skype Judge – Lucas (Football Player).

Running Order

Week 6
Judges in order from left to right: Artistic Jury – Deborah Secco (Actress), Beto Barbosa (Singer), Felix Fassone (Contigo! Magazine Director); Technical Jury – Suely Machado (Choreographer), J.C. Violla (Choreographer); Skype Judge – Dudu Nobre (Singer).

Running Order

Week 7
Judges in order from left to right: Artistic Jury – Carlos Miele (Stylist), Paloma Bernardi (Actress), André Gonçalves (Actor); Technical Jury – Claudia Raia (Actress and Ballet Dancer), Ciro Barcelos (Choreographer); Skype Judge – Christine Fernandes (Actress).

Running Order

Week 8
Judges in order from left to right: Artistic Jury – Dionísio Chaves (Somellier), Carolina Ferraz (Actress), Carmo Dalla Vecchia (Actor); Technical Jury – Ana Botafogo (Ballet Dancer and Actress), Renato Vieira (Choreographer); Skype Judge – Perlla (Funk Singer).

Running Order

Week 9
Judges in order from left to right: Artistic Jury – Barbara Fialho (Model), Marcos Paulo (Film and Soap Director), Wanessa (Singer); Technical Jury – Octavio Nassur (Street Dance Teacher), Hulda Bittencourt (Ballet Dancer).

Running Order

Week 10
Judges in order from left to right: Artistic Jury – Flavia Alessandra (Actress), Sheron Menezes (Actress), José Simão (Journalist); Technical Jury – Edson Guiu (Dancer and Choreographer), Carlota Portella (Choreographer).

Running Order

Week 11
Judges in order from left to right: Artistic Jury – Juliano Cazarré (Actor), Michella Cruz (Model), Artur Xexeo (Journalist); Technical Jury – Lourdes Braga (Dance Teacher), J.C. Violla (Dance Teacher).

Running Order

Week 12
Judges in order from left to right: Artistic Jury – Jonatas Faro (Actor), Juliana Paes (Actress), Dennis Carvalho (TV Director); Technical Jury – Suely Machado (Choreographer), Ciro Barcelos (Dance Teacher).

Running Order

Week 13
Judges in order from left to right: Artistic Jury – Ana Gequelin (Stylist), Dalton Vigh (Actor), Bruna Lombardi (Actress); Technical Jury – Renato Vieira (Artistic Director), Fernanda Chamma (Artistic Director).

Running Order

Week 14
Judges in order from left to right: Artistic Jury – Anderson Silva (MMA Fighter), Adriana Birolli (Actress), Leandro Hassum (Comedian); Technical Jury – Ana Botafogo (Ballet Dancer), Antonio Cervila Junior (Tango Teacher).

Running Order

Week 15
Judges in order from left to right: Artistic Jury – Massimo Ferrari (Chef), Regina Martelli (Fashion Consultant), Artur Xexeo (Journalist), Paola Oliveira (Actress), Rodrigo Lombardi (Actor), Fernanda Souza (Actress); Technical Jury – Carlinhos de Jesus (Choreographer), Fernanda Chamma (artistic director), J.C. Violla (Dance Teacher), Maria Pia Finocchio (artistic director).

Running Order

Call-Out Order
The table below lists the order in which the contestants' fates were revealed by Faustão.

 The celebrity did not perform
 The celebrity was brought back into the competition
 The celebrity was eliminated
 The celebrity won the competition
 This couple came in first place with the judges.

 Week 7 was the wild card round.

Dance Schedule
The celebrities and professional partners danced one of these routines for each corresponding week.

 Week 1: Presentation of the Celebrities
Aired: May 15, 2011

 Week 2: Disco – Women
Aired: May 22, 2011

 Week 3: Disco – Men
Aired: May 29, 2011

 Week 4: Forró – Women
Aired: June 5, 2011

 Week 5: Forró – Men
Aired: June 12, 2011

 Week 6: Lambada – Women
Aired: June 19, 2011

 Week 7: Lambada – Men
Aired: June 26, 2011

 Week 8: Rock and Roll – Repechage
Aired: July 3, 2011

 Week 9: Street Dance – Team A
Aired: July 24, 2011

 Week 10: Street Dance  – Team B
Aired: July 31, 2011

 Week 11: Foxtrot  – Top 6
Aired: August 7, 2011

 Week 12: Salsa  – Top 5
Aired: August 14, 2011

 Week 13: Waltz  – Top 4
Aired: August 21, 2011

 Week 14: Tango  – Top 3
Aired: August 28, 2011

 Week 15: Pasodoble & Samba  – Top 2
Aired: September 4, 2011

Dance Chart

 Highest Scoring Dance
 Lowest Scoring Dance

References

External links
 

2011 Brazilian television seasons
Season 08

pt:Dança dos Famosos 8
pt:Dança dos Famosos